Hendersonia may refer to:
 Hendersonia (fungus), a genus of fungi in the family Phaeosphaeriaceae
 Hendersonia (gastropod), a genus of gastropods in the family Helicinidae
 Hendersonia, a genus of protists in the family Heterohelicidae, synonym of Parasigalia